Norbert Mazány (born 19 February 1978) is a Hungarian former professional tennis player.

Mazány, a national indoor champion, attained a best singles world ranking of 455 and won one ITF Futures title. He represented Hungary in a Davis Cup tie in 1998, against Ireland in Budapest, which the home side won. Featuring twice in singles, he registered a win over Scott Barron (9–7 in the fifth set) then lost dead rubber to John Doran.

ITF Futures titles

Singles: (1)

See also
List of Hungary Davis Cup team representatives

References

External links
 
 
 

1978 births
Living people
Hungarian male tennis players